Plasmarl railway station served the suburb of Plasmarl, in the historical county of Glamorgan, Wales, from 1881 to 1956 on the Morriston branch.

History
The station was opened on 9 May 1881 by the Great Western Railway. It temporarily closed on 9 May 1921 due to a coal strike but it reopened on 20 June. It closed permanently on 11 June 1956.

References

Disused railway stations in Swansea
Former Great Western Railway stations
Railway stations in Great Britain opened in 1881
Railway stations in Great Britain closed in 1956
1881 establishments in Wales
1956 disestablishments in Wales